The 18th Youth in Film Awards ceremony (now known as the Young Artist Awards), presented by the Youth in Film Association, honored outstanding youth performers under the age of 21 in the fields of film, television, music and radio for the 1995–1996 season, and took place in 1997 in Hollywood, California.

Established in 1978 by long-standing Hollywood Foreign Press Association member, Maureen Dragone, the Youth in Film Association was the first organization to establish an awards ceremony specifically set to recognize and award the contributions of performers under the age of 21 in the fields of film, television, theatre and music.

Categories
★ Bold indicates the winner in each category.

Best Young Performer in a Feature Film

Best Performance in a Feature Film: Leading Young Actor
★ Lucas Black - Sling Blade
Vincent Kartheiser - Alaska
Joe Perrino - Sleepers
Kyle Howard - House Arrest
Kevin Bishop - Muppet Treasure Island

Best Performance in a Feature Film: Leading Young Actress
★ Michelle Trachtenberg - Harriet the Spy
Mara Wilson - Matilda
Thora Birch - Alaska
Anna Paquin - Fly Away Home
Heather Matarazzo - Welcome to the Dollhouse

Best Performance in a Feature Film: Supporting Young Actor
★ Blake Bashoff - Big Bully
Gregory Smith - Harriet the Spy
Brawley Nolte - Ransom
Geoffrey Wigdor - Sleepers
Adam Zolotin - Jack

Best Performance in a Feature Film: Supporting Young Actress
★ (tie) Vanessa Lee Chester - Harriet the Spy
★ (tie) Claire Danes - To Gillian on Her 37th Birthday
Jessica Wesson - Flipper
Kira Spencer Hesser - Matilda
Erin Williby - First Kid

Best Performance in a Feature Film: Actor Age Ten or Under
★ Jonathan Lipnicki - Jerry Maguire
Alex D. Linz - One Fine Day
Jake Lloyd - Unhook the Stars
Haley Joel Osment - Bogus
Eric Lloyd, - Dunston Checks In
Ross Bagley - Independence Day

Best Performance in a Feature Film: Actress Age Ten or Under
★ Mae Whitman - One Fine Day
Ashley Buccille - Phenomenon
Siri Howard - Welcome to the Dollhouse
Yvonne Zima - The Long Kiss Goodnight

Best Young Performer in a Foreign Film

Best Performance in a Foreign Film
★ Andrei Chalimon - Kolya (Czech Republic)
Chloe Ferguson - The Quiet Room (Australia)
Tiba Tossijn - Long Live the Queen (The Netherlands)
Tatjana Trieb - Beyond Silence (Germany)
Gregg Fitzgerald - War of the Buttons (Ireland)

Best Young Performer in a TV Movie or Mini Series

Best Performance in a TV Movie / Mini Series: Young Actor
★ Kenny Vadas - Captains Courageous
Shelton Dane - Hidden in America
Noah Fleiss - Chasing the Dragon
Devon Sawa - Night of the Twisters
Erik von Detten - Christmas Every Day
Tim Redwine - Step Toward Tomorrow

Best Performance in a TV Movie / Mini Series: Young Actress
★ Jena Malone - Bastard Out of Carolina
Kimberlee Peterson - Homecoming
Rebekah Johnson - Ruby Jean and Joe
Julia McIlvaine - The Summer of Ben Tyler
Tegan Moss - The Angel of Pennsylvania Avenue
Allison Jones - Nightjohn

Best Young Performer in a Television Series

Best Performance in a TV Drama Series: Young Actor
★ Shawn Toovey - Dr. Quinn, Medicine Woman
David Gallagher - 7th Heaven
Ryan Merriman - The Pretender
Austin O'Brien - Promised Land
George O. Gore II - New York Undercover
Darris Love - The Secret World of Alex Mack

Best Performance in a TV Drama Series: Young Actress
★ Beverley Mitchell - 7th Heaven
Lacey Chabert - Party of Five
Ashley Peldon - The Pretender
Jessica Bowman - Dr. Quinn Medicine Woman
Sarah Schaub - Promised Land
Larisa Oleynik - The Secret World of Alex Mack

Best Performance in a TV Comedy: Leading Young Actor
★ Michael Galeota - Bailey Kipper's P.O.V.
Matthew and Andrew Lawrence - Brotherly Love
Ben Savage - Boy Meets World

Best Performance in a TV Comedy: Leading Young Actress
★ Melissa Joan Hart - Sabrina the Teenage Witch
Brandy Norwood - Moesha
Tia and Tamera Mowry - Sister, Sister

Best Performance in a TV Comedy: Supporting Young Actor
★ Billy L. Sullivan - Something So Right
Zane Carney - Dave's World
Shaun Weiss - Mr. Rhodes
Joseph Gordon-Levitt - 3rd Rock From the Sun
Rider Strong - Boy Meets World

Best Performance in a TV Comedy: Supporting Young Actress
 Kaitlin Cullum - Grace Under Fire
Marne Patterson - Something So Right
Lindsay Sloane - Mr. Rhodes
Alana Austin - Ink
Danielle Fishel - Boy Meets World

Best Performance in a TV Comedy/Drama: Supporting Young Actor Age Ten or Under
★ Curtis Williams Jr. - The Parent 'Hood
Andrew Ducote - Dave's World
Marcus Paulk - Moesha
Hayden Tank - The Young and the Restless
Eddie Karr - Promised Land
Haley Joel Osment - The Jeff Foxworthy Show

Best Performance in a TV Comedy/Drama: Supporting Young Actress Age Ten or Under
★ Ashli Amari Adams - The Parent 'Hood
Alexa Vega - Life's Work
Mackenzie Rosman - 7th Heaven
Brittany Tiplady - Millennium
Caitlin Wachs - Profiler

Best Performance in a TV Drama Series: Guest Starring Young Actor
★ Ben Salisbury - Promised Land
Nathan Watt - Chicago Hope
Zachary McLemore - Dr. Quinn, Medicine Woman
Elijah Wood - Homicide: Life on the Street
Sam Gifaldi - Touched By An Angel
Austin O'Brien - ER

Best Performance in a TV Drama Series: Guest Starring Young Actress
★ Scarlett Pomers - Touched By An Angel
Tabitha Lupien - Goosebumps
Teru McDonald - Pandora's Clock
Kirsten Dunst - ER
Francesca Smith - The Secret World of Alex Mack

Best Performance in a TV Comedy: Guest Starring Young Performer
★ (tie) Seth Adkins - Sabrina the Teenage Witch
★  tie) Courtney Peldon - Home Improvement
Robin Marie Verner - Sister, Sister
Shay Astar - 3rd Rock from the Sun
Miles Marsico - Married... with Children
Bridget Flanery - Pearl

Best Performance in a Daytime Drama: Young Actor
★ Kyle Sabihy - The Bold and the Beautiful
Christian Seifert - As the World Turns
Steven Hartman - The Bold and the Beautiful
Jonathan Jackson - General Hospital
Spencer Treat Clark - Another World

Best Performance in a Daytime Drama: Young Actress
★ Landry Albright - The Bold and the Beautiful
Alison Sweeney - Days of Our Lives
Erin Torpey - One Life to Live
Kimberly McCullough - General Hospital
Kimberly Brown - Guiding Light

Best Young Performer in a Voice-Over

Best Performance in a Voice-Over: Young Artist
★ Jonathan Taylor Thomas - The Adventures of Pinocchio
Paul Terry - James and the Giant Peach
Adam Wylie - All Dogs Go to Heaven 2
Charity Sanoy - Rugrats

Best Young Ensemble Performance

Best Performance in a TV Movie / Home Video: Young Ensemble
★ What Love Sees
Trevor O'Brien, Courtland Mead, Ashlee Lauren, Cody McMains
Homecoming
William Greenblatt, Kimberlee Peterson, Trevor O'Brien, Hanna Hall
Clubhouse Detectives
Jimmy Galeota, Michael Galeota, Christopher Ball, Alex Miranda, Thomas Hobson
Forest Warrior
Trenton Knight, Megan Paul, Josh Wolford, Michael Friedman, Jordan Brower

Best Performance in a TV Series: Young Ensemble
★ Nick Freno: Licensed Teacher
Ross Malinger, Jonathan Hernandez, Kyle Gibson, Arjay Smith, Cara DeLizia
Saved by the Bell: The New Class
Lindsey McKeon, Samantha Becker, Sarah Lancaster, Anthony Harrell, Ben Gould, Richard Lee Jackson
Second Noah
Erika Page, Jeffrey Licon, Gemini Barnett, Jeremy Togerson, Jon Torgerson, Ashley Gorrell, Zelda Harris

Best Young Host in Television or Radio

Outstanding Host: Television or Radio
★ Lindsay - Radio AAHS
R. J. Arnett - Radio AAHS
Roland Thomson - World Youth News

Best Young Entertainer: Acting and Singing

Best Male Entertainer
★ Adam Wylie
Chris Allport
Josh Keaton

Best Female Entertainer
★ Kristi McClave
Nassira Nicola
Ivyann Schwan

Best Family Entertainment

Best Family TV Movie or Mini Series: Network
★ What Love Sees - CBSThe Summer of Ben Tyler - CBS
A Step Toward Tomorrow - CBS
Gulliver's Travels - NBC

Best Family TV Movie or Mini Series: Cable
★ Captains Courageous - Family ChannelNightjohn - The Disney Channel
Homecoming - Showtime
The Angel of Pennsylvania Avenue - Family Channel
Christmas Every Day - Family Channel

Best Family TV Drama Series
★ 7th Heaven - WBThe Secret World of Alex Mack - Nickelodeon
Promised Land - CBS
Touched By An Angel - CBS

Best Family TV Comedy Series
★ Nick Freno: Licensed Teacher - WBSabrina the Teenage Witch - ABC
Clueless - ABC
Mr. Rhodes - NBC

Best Educational Film or TV Show
★ Nick News - NickelodeonThe Leopard Son - Discovery Pictures
Kratt's Creatures - Paragon Entertainment
Wishbone - Big Feats Entertainment

Best Family Feature Film: Foreign
★ Kolya - (Czech Republic)Luna e l'altra (Italy)
Long Live the Queen (The Netherlands)
Beyond Silence (Germany)
War of the Buttons (Ireland)
The Eighth Day (Belgium)

Best Family Feature Film: Animation or Special Effects
★ James and the Giant Peach - Walt DisneyThe Hunchback of Notre Dame - Walt Disney
Space Jam - Warner Brothers
Muppet Treasure Island - Walt Disney
All Dogs Go to Heaven 2 - MGM

Best Family Feature Film: Musical or Comedy
★ One Fine Day - 20th Century FoxThat Thing You Do - 20th Century Fox
101 Dalmatians - Walt Disney
Dunston Checks In - 20th Century Fox
Jack - Hollywood Pictures

Best Family Feature Film: Drama
★ Fly Away Home - Columbia PicturesAlaska - Castle Rock
Harriet the Spy - Paramount
Flipper - Universal
Bogus - Warner Brothers

Youth In Film's Special Awards

The Jackie Coogan Award

Outstanding Contribution to Youth Through Motion Pictures
★ The Reppies - For Best Musical and Inspirational Show for ChildrenThe Michael Landon Award

Outstanding Contribution to Youth Through Television
★ Dana Lightstone - Producer, Children's ProductionsFormer Child Star Lifetime Achievement Award
★ Paul Petersen - The Donna Reed Show

Outstanding Young Performer in a Television Commercial
★ Travis Tedford - Welch's Grape Juice & Jelly

Scholarship Recipients
★ Gabby and Katie Gillette
★ Aimee Walker

References

External links
Official site

Young Artist Awards ceremonies
1996 film awards
1996 television awards
1997 in California
1997 in American cinema
1997 in American television